The 1979–80 season was Stoke City's 73rd season in the Football League and the 47th in the First Division.

With Stoke now back in the First Division after a two-year absence the main aim of 1979–80 was to remain there. It was a difficult season for Stoke but they managed to achieve their aim finishing in a safe position of 18th five points away from relegation.

Season review

League
Durban recognised the need to strengthen his squad for the challenges of top-flight football and with veteran Denis Smith skippering the side he added to it Ray Evans a former Tottenham Hotspur right back, and goalkeeper Eric McManus. It was around his time that the introduction of foreign players from across Europe began to influence English football. And in keeping with the times Stoke signed their first player from the continent, Dutch midfielder Loek Ursem from AZ '67 for the equivalent of £85,000 in Dutch guilders. The players Durban brought to the Victoria Ground were respected more for their work rate than their flair but Ursem was something of an inspiration. Whilst he never fully commanded a regular place in the side he was a very popular player with the fans but at times lacked that extra bit of class to make him a top player.

Stoke also unveiled the new Stoke End stand in the summer of 1979, capable of seating 4,250 it was built from the proceeds of the club's successful commercial department whose lotteries were key to their success. After a good start to the season with two home wins the tough task of First Division football began to cause Stoke problems and they remained in the bottom six all season. They avoided an instant return to the Second Division with little to spare finishing in 18th position with 36 points.

FA Cup
Stoke had two men controversially sent-off as Burnley won 1–0 at Turf Moor. With the match seemingly destined for a replay referee Kevin McNally caused controversy as he sent off Denis Smith for time-wasting as he was going off injured. He then awarded Burnley a penalty after Billy Hamilton was fouled by Ray Evans, Martin Dobson scoring from the spot. Stoke were then reduced to nine men as Evans was then sent-off for dissent.

League Cup
This season saw the introduction of two legged matches in the early rounds of the League Cup, Stoke beating Swansea City but then losing to Swindon Town.

Final league table

Results

Stoke's score comes first

Legend

Football League First Division

FA Cup

League Cup

Friendlies

Squad statistics

References

Stoke City F.C. seasons
Stoke